The Apostolic Nunciature to Nepal provides for the representation of the Holy See to the Government of Nepal. The nuncio resides in New Delhi, India.

The Holy See and Nepal established diplomatic relations on 10 September 1983. Pope John Paul II created the Apostolic Nunciature to Nepal on that day.

Papal representatives to Nepal

Pro-Nuncios
Agostino Cacciavillan (30 April 1985 - 13 June 1990)
Giorgio Zur (13 August 1990 – 7 December 1998)

Nuncios
Lorenzo Baldisseri (23 June 1999 - 12 November 2002)
Pedro López Quintana (8 February 2003 – 10 December 2009)
Salvatore Pennacchio (13 November 2010 – 6 August 2016)
Giambattista Diquattro (21 January 2017 – 29 August 2020)
 Leopoldo Girelli (13 September 2021 – present)

References

Apostolic Nuncios to Nepal
Nepal
Diplomatic missions in Kathmandu
Diplomatic missions in Nepal